The 2017–18 season was Associazione Sportiva Roma's 90th in existence and 89th season in the top flight of Italian football. The club competed in Serie A, the Coppa Italia, and the UEFA Champions League, qualifying directly to the group stage after finishing runners-up to Juventus.

The season was the first since 1991–92 that Francesco Totti was not part of the first-team squad, having retired at the end of the previous season. On 13 June 2017, former Sassuolo coach Eusebio Di Francesco was appointed as Roma manager, replacing Luciano Spalletti, who left for Inter.

On 5 December 2017, the Stadio della Roma project – after experiencing five years of delays due to conflicting interests from various parties in the local government – was given the go-ahead to begin construction. It is slated to open in time for the 2020–21 season and will replace the Stadio Olimpico as Roma's ground.

Players

Squad information
Last updated on 20 May 2018
Appearances and goals include all competitions

Transfers

In

Loans in

Out

Loans out

Pre-season and friendlies

Competitions

Serie A

League table

Results summary

Results by round

Matches

Coppa Italia

UEFA Champions League

Group stage

Knockout phase

Round of 16

Quarter-finals

Semi-finals

Statistics

Appearances and goals

|-
! colspan=14 style="background:#B21B1C; color:#FFD700; text-align:center"| Goalkeepers

|-
! colspan=14 style="background:#B21B1C; color:#FFD700; text-align:center"| Defenders

|-
! colspan=14 style="background:#B21B1C; color:#FFD700; text-align:center"| Midfielders

|-
! colspan=14 style="background:#B21B1C; color:#FFD700; text-align:center"| Forwards

|-
! colspan=14 style="background:#B21B1C; color:#FFD700; text-align:center"| Players transferred out during the season

Goalscorers

Last updated: 20 May 2018

Clean sheets

Last updated: 20 May 2018

Disciplinary record

Last updated: 20 May 2018

Notes

References

A.S. Roma seasons
Roma
Roma